Punctapinella is a genus of moths belonging to the family Tortricidae.

Species
Punctapinella ambatoana  Razowski & Pelz, 2004
Punctapinella braziliana  Brown, 1991
Punctapinella cerithiphora  Razowski & Pelz, 2004
Punctapinella chione  Razowski & Becker, 1999
Punctapinella chionocarpa  (Meyrick, 1932) 
Punctapinella conchitella Razowski & Wojtusiak, 2010
Punctapinella conchitis  (Meyrick, 1912) 
Punctapinella cosangana  Razowski & Pelz, 2004
Punctapinella guamoteana Razowski & Wojtusiak, 2009
Punctapinella hypsithrona  (Meyrick, 1926) 
Punctapinella lojana  Razowski & Pelz, 2004 
Punctapinella marginipunctata Razowski & Wojtusiak, 2013
Punctapinella niphastra  (Meyrick, 1931) 
Punctapinella niphochroa   Razowski & Becker, 1999
Punctapinella nivaspis  Razowski & Becker, 1999 
Punctapinella paraconchitis Razowski & Wojtusiak, 2008
Punctapinella paratheta  Razowski & Pelz, 2003
Punctapinella scleroductus  Brown, 1991
Punctapinella theta  Brown, 1991
Punctapinella tinajillana Razowski & Pelz, 2004
Punctapinella viridargentea Razowski & Wojtusiak, 2009

References

 , 1991, Contrib. Sci. (Los Angeles Co. Mus. Nat. Hist.) 423: 2.
 , 2005, World Catalogue of Insects 5
 , 2004: Remarks on Punctapinella Brown, 1991 (Lepidoptera: Tortricidae: Euliini), with descriptions of five new species from Ecuador. Entomologische Zeitschrift 114 (5): 233-236.
 , 2009: Tortricidae (Lepidoptera) from the mountains of Ecuador and remarks on their geographical distribution. Part IV. Eastern Cordillera. Acta Zoologica Cracoviensia 51B (1-2): 119-187. doi:10.3409/azc.52b_1-2.119-187. Full article: .
 , 2010: Tortricidae (Lepidoptera) from Peru. Acta Zoologica Cracoviensia 53B (1-2): 73-159. . Full article: .
 , 2013: Accessions to the fauna of Neotropical Tortricidae (Lepidoptera). Acta Zoologica Cracoviensia, 56 (1): 9-40. Full article: .

External links
tortricidae.com

Euliini
Tortricidae genera